Robert 'Bob' Charles Addy (born 24 January 1941) is a former British cyclist. He competed in the team time trial at the 1964 Summer Olympics. He also represented England in the road race at the 1962 British Empire and Commonwealth Games in Perth, Western Australia.

References

External links
 

1941 births
Living people
British male cyclists
Olympic cyclists of Great Britain
Cyclists at the 1964 Summer Olympics
People from Northwood, London
Cyclists from Greater London
Cyclists at the 1962 British Empire and Commonwealth Games
Commonwealth Games competitors for England
20th-century British people